The following is a list of international rankings of .

Communications

Mobile Telephony Market Penetration (Pyramid Research, OECD, national regulatory agencies): in 2010, ranked 8 among the East Europe top 10 countries

Demographics

Population ranked 89 out of 239 countries and territories
CIA World Factbook 2008 estimates Life expectancy ranked 138 out of 222 countries
 Population Density: in 2010 ranked 111 out of 235 countries

Economy

Geography

 Total area ranked 86 out of 249 countries

Globalization
KOF: Index of Globalization 2012, ranked 105 out of 208 countries

Health
The World Health Organization's ranking of the world's health systems:  2000, ranked 72 out of 190 countries
Legatum Institute Legatum Prosperity Index's ranking of the world's health systems: 2012, ranked 40 out of 142 countries.

Industry
OICA automobile production 2008, ranked 29 out of the top 51 countries

Society

 The Economist: Quality-of-Life Index 2005 (2012), ranked 100 (54) out of 111 (142) countries
 United Nations: Human Development Index 2011, ranked 65 out of 187 countries
 NEF: Happy Planet Index 2012, ranked 104 out of 143 countries

Tourism

World Tourism Organization: World Tourism rankings 2012, not ranked among top 16 European countries

Transportation

Total rapid transit systems ranked 46 out of 52

Education and Innovation

Political

 Transparency International: Corruption Perceptions Index, ranked 66 out of 163 countries
 Reporters without borders: Worldwide press freedom index, ranked 153 out of 167 countries
The Economist Democracy Index 2007, ranked 150 out of 167 countries

See also
Lists of countries
Lists by country
List of international rankings 
Belarusian State University
Republic of Belarus

References

Belarus